Richard Simeon Gabriel (born 5 June 1952) is a former West Indian cricketer. He played 11 One Day Internationals for the West Indies in 1983-84.

An opening batsman, Gabriel made his debut for Trinidad and Tobago aged just 16 years old in 1969. He was the youngest player to play for the national team. In 1970 he was one of the leading batsmen for the West Indies youth team on their unbeaten tour of England. 

He represented West Indies during the 1983-84 Benson & Hedges World Series Cup One day International tournament in Australia, replacing an injured Gordon Greenidge. He played all of his 11 internationals in Australia that season, between 8 January and 11 February 1984, opening the batting. He scored 167 runs at an average of 15.18. 

He played for Trinidad and Tobago from 1969 till 1986.

References

External links
 
 Richard Gabriel at CricketArchive

1952 births
Living people
Trinidad and Tobago cricketers
North Trinidad cricketers
East Trinidad cricketers
West Indies One Day International cricketers